Annette Zippelius (born 25 June 1949) is a German physicist at the University of Göttingen. In 1998 she became a Gottfried Wilhelm Leibniz Prize winner.
Her research focuses on complex fluids and soft matter – materials that are intermediate between conventional liquids and solids. Examples are glasses, polymeric melts or solutions, gels and foams, but also granular matter. With her research group she aims at elucidating the underlying principles of self-organization that govern their behavior.

Career 
Annette Zippelius studied Physics at the Technical University of Munich and the University of Colorado in Boulder, USA. There she received a master's degree. In 1977 she finished her PhD in Munich. As a postdoc she worked at Harvard University, US, for two years and at Cornell University, US, for a third year. In 1982 she gained her habilitation at Munich. In 1983 she joined the Forschungszentrum Jülich as a researcher.

Since 1988 she is full professor at University of Göttingen, at the Institute for Theoretical Physics.

Awards and honors 

 1993: Member of the Göttingen Academy of Sciences and Humanities (Akademie der Wissenschaften zu Göttingen).
 1998: Leibniz Prize of the Deutsche Forschungsgemeinschaft (DFG)
 2002 – 2006: Member of the Executive Board of the German Physical Society (Deutsche Physikalische Gesellschaft)
 2005 – 2011: Member of The German Council of Science and Humanities (Wissenschaftsrat)
 2007 – 2014: Max-Planck Fellow, Max Planck Institute for Dynamics and Self-Organization, Göttingen
 2008: Elected Fellow of the American Physical Society
 2022: Max Planck Medal of the German Physical Society

References 

1949 births
20th-century  German physicists
20th-century  German women scientists
21st-century  German physicists
21st-century  German women scientists
Fellows of the American Academy of Arts and Sciences
Fellows of the American Physical Society
German women physicists
Gottfried Wilhelm Leibniz Prize winners
Living people
Max Planck Society people
Theoretical physicists
Academic staff of the University of Göttingen
Winners of the Max Planck Medal